Sharlene Flores, born in Trinidad and Tobago, is a singer of parang music.

References

21st-century Trinidad and Tobago women singers
21st-century Trinidad and Tobago singers
Year of birth missing (living people)
Living people